Sentimentale Jugend (German for: Sentimental youth) is a double-album and the fourth full-length album by Italian alternative rock band Klimt 1918. Their first new album in over eight years, it was released in November 2016 on the German label, Prophecy Productions. The first single of this album is "Comandante".

Track listing

Disc I [Sentimentale]
 Montecristo
 Comandante
 La Notte
 It Was To Be
 Belvedere
 Once We Were
 Take My Breath Away
 Sentimentale
 Gaza Youth (Exist/Resist)

Disc II [Jugend]
 Nostalghia
 Fracture
 Ciudad Lineal
 Sant'Angelo (The Sound & The Fury)
 Unemployed & Dreamrunner
 The Hunger Strike
 Resig-nation
 Caelum Stellatum
 Juvenile
 Stupenda E Misera Città
 Lycans [bonus]

Personnel
Marco Soellner — vocals, guitar
Francesco Conte — guitar
Davide Pesola— bass
Paolo Soellner — drums

References 

2016 albums
Klimt 1918 albums